John Myer Bowers (September 25, 1772 – February 24, 1846) was an American politician and a U.S. Representative from New York.

Life and career
Bowers was born in indeana, in the Province of Massachusetts Bay, the son of Mary (Myer) and Henry Bowers. He attended the common schools, and graduated from Columbia College in New York City. Then he studied law and was admitted to the bar in 1802.

Bowers commenced practice in Cooperstown, and moved to his country home, "Lakelands," near Cooperstown, New York, in 1805. He was declared elected as a Federalist to the 13th United States Congress to fill the vacancy caused by the death of Representative-elect William Dowse and served as United States Representative for the fifteenth district of New York from June 21, 1813, to December 20, 1813; when Isaac Williams, Jr., who had contested the election, was declared entitled to the seat. Afterwards, Bowers resumed his practice of law in Cooperstown.

Bowers died in Cooperstown, New York; and was buried at the Lakewood Cemetery there.

References

External links

1772 births
1846 deaths
Columbia College (New York) alumni
People from Cooperstown, New York
Politicians from Boston
Federalist Party members of the United States House of Representatives from New York (state)
Members of the United States House of Representatives removed by contest